Quadrotour-Aero was a Kyrgyzstan based airline operating a fleet of single Ilyushin IL-62, registration EX-62100. This particular aircraft was an original IL-62 series model, not the upgraded IL-62M or IL-62MK like the most, and at the time of airline operations one of only a handful of those still operational.

External links

References

Defunct airlines of Kyrgyzstan
Airlines established in 2000
Airlines disestablished in 2004